Sanninskoye (Hınnı) is a rural locality (a selo) and the administrative centre of Sanninsky Selsoviet, Blagoveshchensky District, Bashkortostan, Russia. The population was 383 as of 2010. There are 2 streets.

Geography 
Sanninskoye is located 35 km northeast of Blagoveshchensk (the district's administrative centre) by road. Alexandrovka is the nearest rural locality.

References 

Rural localities in Blagoveshchensky District